1,1,1,2-tetrafluorodisulfane, also known as 1,2-difluorodisulfane 1,1-difluoride or just difluorodisulfanedifluoride (FSSF3) is an unstable molecular compound of fluorine and sulfur. The molecule has a pair of sulfur atoms, with one fluorine atom on one sulfur, and three fluorine atoms on the other. It has the uncommon property that all the bond lengths are different. The bond strength is not correlated with bond length but is inversely correlated with the force constant (Badger's rule). The molecule can be considered as sulfur tetrafluoride in which a sulfur atom is inserted into a S-F bond.

Atoms are labelled with the sulfur atom connected to three fluorine atoms as Shyp (for hypervalent) and Stop. The fluorine atoms are labelled Ftop attached to Stop, and on the hypervalent S atom: Fcis, the closest F atom to Ftop, Ftrans the furthest away F atom from Ftop, and Feq

Carlowitz first determined the structure in 1983.

Feq is 90° from Ftrans, and 84° from Fcis, and the torsion compared to Ftop is about 95°.

Reactions
The dimerization reaction 2SF2  FSSF3 is reversible. It also disproportionates: SF2 + FSSF3 → FSSF + SF4. A side reaction also produces the intermediate F3SSSF3. hydrogen fluoride catalyses disproportionation to sulfur and sulfur tetrafluoride by forming a reactive intermediate HSF molecule.
When FSSF3 dissociates, the Fcis atom forms a new bond to the Stop atom, and the S-S bond breaks.
As a gas, at ambient and totally clean conditions, FSSF3 decomposes with a half life of about 10 hours. Disproportionation to SSF2 and SF4 catalysed by metal fluorides can take place in under one second. However it is indefinitely stable at -196 °C.

A symmetrical molecule F2SSF2 is calculated to be 15.1 kcal/mol higher in energy than FSSF3.

FSSF3 is easily hydrolysed with water.

FSSF3 spontaneously reacts with oxygen gas to make thionyl fluoride, the only sulfur fluoride that does not need any assistance to do this.
FSSF3 reacts with copper at high temperatures producing copper fluoride and copper sulfide.

Formation
SF3SF can be made in the laboratory when low pressure (10mm) SCl2 vapour is passed over potassium fluoride or mercuric fluoride heated to 150 °C. Byproducts include FSSF, SSF2, SF4, SF3SCl, and FSSCl. SF3SCl can be removed from this mixture in a reaction with mercury. Separation of the sulfur fluorides can be achieved by low temperature distillation. SF3SF distills just above -50 °C.

SF3SF is also made in small amounts by reacting sulfur with silver fluoride, or photolysis of disulfur difluoride and SSF2.
The molecule is formed by the dimerization of sulfur difluoride.

Properties
The nuclear magnetic resonance spectrum of FSSF3 shows four bands, each of eight lines at  -53.2, -5.7, 26.3 and 204.1 ppm.

FSSF3 is stable as a solid, as a liquid below -74 °C and dissolved in other sulfur fluoride liquids. This is in contrast to SF2 which is only stable as a dilute gas.

Infrared vibration bands for FSSF3 are at 810, 678, 530, 725, and 618(S-S) cm−1.

Related
The related compound FSSSF3 has a similar structure, but with an extra sulfur atom in the chain. Thiothionyltetrafluoride, S=SF4 may exist as a gas. It is less energetically favourable to FSSF3 by 37 kJ/mol, but has a high energy barrier of 267 kJ/mol. However it may disproportionate rapidly to sulfur and sulfur tetrafluoride. The other known sulfur fluorides are sulfur difluoride, sulfur tetrafluoride, sulfur hexafluoride, disulfur decafluoride, disulfur difluoride and 1,1-difluorodisulfane, difluorotrisulfane, and difluorotetrasulfane. The Ftop atom can be substituted with Cl to yield ClSSF3 (2-chloro-1,1,1-trifluorodisulfane).

References

Extra reading

 What happens when irradiated by ultraviolet photons.
 animation of dissociation

Sulfur fluorides
Hypervalent molecules